Las Vegas station may refer to:

Las Vegas station (Nevada)
Las Vegas station (New Mexico)